Steven Waddington (born 5 February 1956) is an English former footballer. His father is former Stoke City manager, Tony Waddington.

A midfielder, he made 201 league appearances in an eight-year career in the Football League. He began his career at Stoke City in 1976, before moving on to Walsall three years later. He joined Port Vale in July 1982, before transferring to Chesterfield in July 1983. He moved on to non-league club Macclesfield Town the following year. He played very minor roles in promotion campaigns for both Stoke and Vale, though played a much bigger part in Walsall's promotion out of the Fourth Division in 1979–80.

Career
Waddington played for Stoke City, playing 13 games under his father in 1976–77. He scored his first senior goal on 6 November 1976, in a 3–1 win over Middlesbrough at the Victoria Ground. At the end of the season the "Potters" were relegated out of the First Division, and George Eastham took over as manager. Waddington scored five goals in 41 appearances in 1977–78, as George Eastham, Alan A'Court, and then Alan Durban tried in vain to guide the club out of the Second Division. He played just twice in the 1978–79 promotion campaign. He then moved on to Alan Buckley's Walsall. The "Saddlers" finished second in the Fourth Division in 1979–80, and were thereby promoted. They retained their Third Division status by a single point in 1980–81, before finishing above the drop zone only on goal difference in 1981–82 under new boss Neil Martin.

Waddington then left Fellows Park and joined John McGrath's Port Vale in July 1982. He made his debut in the League Cup First Round first leg 1–0 win over Rochdale at Vale Park on 30 August. He damaged a cartilage during the game and after undergoing surgery failed to regain his place. He appeared as a substitute later in the season, but was transferred to Chesterfield in July 1983. The "Valiants" had by then won promotion out of the Fourth Division. The "Spireites" finished 13th in the Fourth Division in 1983–84 under the stewardship of John Duncan. He left Saltergate and moved on to Macclesfield Town in 1984. Whilst at Macclesfield Town in summer 1986 he was in a car crash with teammates Nigel Shaw, Ian Elsby and Trevor Brissett. The "Silkmen" went on to win the Northern Premier League in 1986–87.

Career statistics
Source:

A.  The "Other" column constitutes appearances and goals in the Football League Trophy.

Honours
Stoke City
Football League Second Division third-place promotion: 1978–79

Walsall
Football League Fourth Division second-place promotion: 1979–80

Port Vale
Football League Fourth Division third-place promotion: 1982–83

References

1956 births
Living people
People from Nantwich
Sportspeople from Cheshire
English footballers
Association football midfielders
Stoke City F.C. players
Walsall F.C. players
Port Vale F.C. players
Chesterfield F.C. players
Macclesfield Town F.C. players
English Football League players
Northern Premier League players